Acrocercops coffeifoliella is a moth of the family Gracillariidae. It is known from India, Sri Lanka, Indonesia (Java), Réunion and Madagascar.

The larvae feed on Coffea species. They probably mine the leaves of their host plant.

References

coffeifoliella
Moths of Asia
Moths described in 1861
Moths of Madagascar
Moths of Réunion
Moths of Africa